Philip LeDuc (born June 5, 1970) is the William J. Brown Professor at Carnegie Mellon University (CMU) and the Founding Director of its Center for the Mechanics and Engineering of Cellular Systems. He is in the department of Mechanical Engineering, but also has appointments in Biological Sciences, Computational Biology, Biomedical Engineering, and Electrical and Computer Engineering.  LeDuc works at the intersection of mechanical engineering and biology.

Biography 
LeDuc earned his bachelor's degree and master's degree in mechanical engineering from North Carolina State University in 1993 and 1995, respectively. In 1998, he completed his Ph.D. at Johns Hopkins University. From 1999 to 2002, LeDuc was a research fellow at Children's Hospital/Harvard Medical School.

In 2002, LeDuc became an assistant professor in  mechanical engineering = at CMU. He was promoted to associate professor in 2007 and full professor in 2011.

Awards 
*LeDuc has received a Bill & Melinda Gates Foundation Grand Challenges Award, National Science Foundation CAREER  and a Beckman Young Investigator Award (2nd professor ever at Carnegie Mellon to win this award). He is an elected fellow of the Biomedical Engineering Society, American Society of Mechanical Engineers, and American Institute for Medical Biological Engineering.  At CMU, he has served as the Faculty Chair for the College of Engineering and is the founding director of the Center for the Mechanics and Engineering of Cellular Systems. He also has been a founder of many companies including Lifeware Labs and Innovalgae.

His wife, Rachel, and Philip have a daughter and two sons. He has  been involved with many philanthropic organizations including raising money for non-profit organizations and mission trips to Africa and Armenia

Research 
Philip LeDuc has always been fascinated by nature and machines. When he was younger, he would take apart lawn mowers and also would admire nature for its wonderfully unique features. These two seemingly unrelated areas have led him down fascinating paths of merging engineering and biology. As an engineer, he was trained to think about systems such as planes, trains, and automobiles, and now he has a similar approach but the “systems” that he investigates are biology. These biological systems include humans as he studies diseases from cancer to neurology, but even more interesting is his passion for non-mammalian systems. These systems include plants, energy generating bacteria, developmental biology systems, etc. He is fascinated by unique features that have evolved over history for different organisms and if these advantages can be used to help people. He is fascinated with the idea of finding unifying principles linking different systems together. Along with his scientific pursuits, he also challenges himself with how to use what he has learned toward translational systems to develop technology and approaches to better mankind.

Selected works 
LeDuc is the author of over 110 peer-reviewed publications. Some selected ones are:

 Justus, K.B., Lewis, D., Majidi, C.*, LeDuc, P.R.,*, Tan, C.* A Biosensing Soft Robot: Integrating Chemical and Optical Responsive Synthetic Cells with Soft Robotics. Science Robotics 4: eaax0765 (2019).
 Wood, A.R., Garg, R., Justus, K., Cohen-Karni, T., LeDuc, P.R.*, Alan J. Russell, A.J.*  Intact Mangrove Root Electrodes for Desalination. RSC Advances 9: 4735-4743 (2019).
 Shorr, A.Z., Sönmez, U., Minden, J.S.*, LeDuc, P.R.* High-throughput Mechanotransduction in Drosophila Embryos with Mesofluidics. Lab on a Chip 19: 1141-1152 (2019, cover).
 Egan, P., Moore, J., Ehrlicher, A., Weitz, D., Schunn, C.*, Cagan, J.*, LeDuc, P.* Robust Mechanobiological Behavior Emerges in Heterogeneous Myosin Systems. Proceedings of the National Academy of Sciences 114: E8147–E8154 (2017).
 Kim, Y.T., Hazar, M., Vijayraghavan, D., Song, J., Messner, W.C.*, Davidson, L.A.*, LeDuc, P.R.* Mechanochemical Actuators of Embryonic Epithelial Contractility. Proceedings of the National Academy of Sciences 111, 14366–14371 (2014). 
 Egan, P., Sinko, R., LeDuc, P.R.*, Keten, S.* The Role of Mechanics in Biological and Bio-Inspired Systems. Nature Communications 6: 7418, DOI: 10.1038/ncomms8418 (2015).
 LeDuc, P.R., Agaba, M., Cheng, C.-M., Gracio, J., Guzman, A., Middelberg, A. Beyond Disease, How Biomedical Engineering Can Improve Global Health. Science Translational Medicine 6, 266fs48 (2014).
 Tan, C., Saurabh, S., Bruchez, M., Schwartz, R.*, LeDuc, P.R.* Molecular Crowding Shapes Gene Expression in Synthetic Cellular Nanosystems. Nature Nanotechnology 8, 602–608 (Cover, 2013).
 LeDuc, P.R.*, Messner, W.C.,* & Wikswo, J.P.* How Do Control-Based Approaches Enter into Biology? Annual Reviews of Biomedical Engineering 13, 369-396 (2011).
 Cheng, C.M., Lin, Y-W, Bellin, R.M., Cheng, C.M., Steward, R., Cheng, Y.-R., LeDuc, P.R.*, & Chen, C-C* Probing Localized Neural Mechanotransduction through Surface-Modified Elastomeric Matrices and Electrophysiology Nature Protocols 714, 5 (4), 714-724 (2010). 
 Bellin, R.M.*, Kubicek, J.D., Frigault, M.J., Kamien, A.J., Steward, R., Barnes, H.M., DiGiacomo, M.B., Duncan, L.J., Edgerly, C.K., Morse, E.M., Park, C.Y., Fredberg, J.J., Cheng, C.M., & LeDuc, P.R.* Defining the Role of Syndecan-4 in Mechanotransduction using Surface-Modification Approaches. Proceedings of the National Academy of Sciences 106, 22102-22107 (2009).
 Helmick, L., Antúnez de Mayolo, A., Zhang, Y., Cheng, C.M., Watkins, S.C., Wu, C. & LeDuc, P.* Spatiotemporal Response of Living Cell Structures in Dictyostelium discoideum with Semiconductor Quantum Dots Nano Letters 8, 1303 – 1308 (2008).
 LeDuc, P*., Wong, M*., et al. Toward an In Vivo Biologically-Inspired Nanofactory Nature Nanotechnology 2, 3-7 (2007).
 Takayama, S., Ostuni, E., LeDuc, P., Naruse, K., Ingber, D. E. & Whitesides, G. M. Subcellular positioning of small molecules. Nature 411, 1016. (2001).
 LeDuc, P., Haber, C., Bao, G. & Wirtz, D. Dynamics of individual flexible polymers in a shear flow. Nature 399, 564–6. (1999).
[*] Corresponding Author

References 

1950 births
Living people
Carnegie Mellon University faculty
North Carolina State University alumni